Kemisara Paladesh, nicknamed Belle, is a Thai actress. She was born on September 16, 1995. She is a Thai TV show host of "GTH On Air". The show is called "GANG 'MENT Boys Meet Girls". The former name of this show was called "Play Channel" or "Play Gang Len-sa-nook Sook-yok-koun". She later became best known for her role as "Koi Wiriya Korkeartpirom" from Hormones: The Series. Belle first started getting into the entertainment industry by winning the contest called Friend For Film Phuean Chan Dan Hai Sut (เพื่อนฉันดันให้สุด) of GTH.

Personal life 
ฺBelle is the second child of Kematat Paladesh,  president of Bangkok Media Broadcasting, the operator of the PPTV HD channel in Thailand. She also has a brother. His name is Kasempong Paladesh, nickname "Best". She graduated from Ekamai International School and bachelor's degree  at Thammasart University, majoring in British And American Studies (BAS).

Other work

Short film 
 2013: Tor-Pai-Mai-Kong: Tiang-Kuen, played as "Ou"

Music video

TV show host

Series

References

1995 births
Living people
Kemisara Paladesh
Kemisara Paladesh
Thai television personalities
Kemisara Paladesh
Kemisara Paladesh
Kemisara Paladesh
Kemisara Paladesh